A list of films produced in the Soviet Union in 1942 (see 1942 in film).

1942

See also
1942 in the Soviet Union

External links
 Soviet films of 1942 at the Internet Movie Database

1942
Soviet
Films